Olivella olssoni is a species of small sea snail, marine gastropod mollusk in the subfamily Olivellinae, in the family Olividae, the olives.  Species in the genus Olivella are commonly called dwarf olives.

Description

Distribution
This marine species occurs off Guadeloupe.

References

 Paulmier G. (2015). Les Olivellidae (Neogastropoda) des Antilles françaises. Description de quatre nouvelles espèces. Xenophora Taxonomy. 8: 3-23.

olssoni
Gastropods described in 1971